Morgan Jones is a Welsh television presenter.

He is best known for his role as the presenter of the S4C European football show, Sgorio, and is the longest running presenter of Sgorio (14 years).
His general interest in sport has seen him present the Snowdon Race and the Snowdonia Marathon for many years.
He has also presented live broadcasts for many years covering Wales's major cultural events including the National Eisteddfod, the Urdd Eisteddfod, the Llangollen International Eisteddfod and the Royal Welsh show. And the 'Digwyddiadau' series took him to various events around the country for many years.

He has a musical background, and this gave him the opportunity to present the 'Côr Cymru' and 'Band Cymru' competitions with Rondomedia. He also presents the Cardiff Singers Competition and has frequently presented the Bryn Terfel Scholarship.
Morgan also presented the TV quiz programmes "0 ond 1" and Tipit with Alex Jones.

References

Living people
Year of birth missing (living people)
Welsh-language television presenters
Welsh television presenters